The triplespine deepwater cardinalfish (Sphyraenops bairdianus) is a species of deepwater cardinalfish of probably cosmopolitan distribution at depths from .  This species is the only known member of its genus.

References

Epigonidae
Monotypic fish genera
Fish described in 1861